This is a breakdowns of the European Coal and Steel Community parliament delegations. This parliamentary session is from 1952 to 1958

 Members ECSC for Belgium 1952–1958
 Members ECSC for France 1952–1958
 Members ECSC for Italy 1952–1958
 Members ECSC for Luxembourg 1952–1958
 List of members of the European Coal and Steel Community Parliament for the Netherlands, 1952–1958
 Members ECSC for West-Germany 1952–1958